Hanna-Lina Boubezari (born November 21, 1998 in Sweden) is an Algerian footballer who plays for Lidkopings FK.

International career
In 2019, Boubezari was called up to the Algeria women's national football team for the first time for a pair of 2020 Olympic quailfiers against Nigeria.

In 2020, Boubezari was called up again, this time for the 2020 UNAF Women's Tournament in Tunisia. Boubezari scored a goal in the second game against Mauritania, a 5-0 win.

References

External links
 

1998 births
Algerian women's footballers
Algeria women's international footballers
Damallsvenskan players
Kungsbacka DFF players
Living people
Swedish people of Algerian descent
Swedish women's footballers
Umeå IK players
Jitex BK players
Women's association footballers not categorized by position